30 Hronia Katy Garbi (Live Katrakio 2019) (trans. 30 Χρόνια Καίτη Γαρμπή [Live Κατράκειο 2019]; 30 Years Katy Garbi [Live Katrakio 2019]) is a live album by Greek singer Katy Garbi recorded in 2019 and released in 2020 by Panik Records.

The album is Garbi's second live album; a three-disc compilation of songs performed during a special concert held at the Katrakio Theater in Nikaia in honour of Garbi's 30 years of discography. The album features performances by Eleni Foureira, Giorgos Papadopoulos, Antonis Remos, Giorgos Sabanis, Dimitris Schinas, Dionisis Schinas and Kostas Tournas.

Release, Promotion, Marketing
The album was first released through digital platforms on 13 April 2020 by Panik Platinum and licensed by Heart Events. Due to the COVID-19 pandemic, Panik Platinum chose to delay the physical release of the live CD until 03 August 2020. The physical version of the album contained all seventy-two tracks from the digital release of the concert into three CDs, as well as three hours of concert footage on DVD. The package also contained 80-pages worth of artwork from Garbi's 30 years of discography.

Broadcast
The concert held on 16 September 2019 was filmed by Garbi's longtime video collaborator, Giorgos Gkavalos. An edited cut of the concert was broadcast on Greek free-to-air channel Alpha TV on 18 April 2020 as part of Easter Sunday line-up. The broadcast version of the concert is limited to 103 minutes, featuring only one song performed with each guest singer and omitting 67 minutes of the concert that appear on the album recording.

The Alpha TV broadcast gained 8.2 per cent of viewership for the late night time-slot, ranking second to the Mega Channel broadcast of Antonis Remos' Live Experience Tour, also featuring Garbi as a guest performer, which acquired 13.2 per cent of overall viewership.

Track listing

Charts
The album debuted at number 1 on Greece's i-tunes charts on its digital release. On its physical release, the album debuted at number 6 on the Greek combined album charts, peaking at number 5, spending a total of 8 weeks on the chart.

Credits and Personnel

Personnel 
Sotiris Agrafiotis: keyboards

Chrisa Bandeli: backing vocals

Christos Bousdoukos: violin

Kostas Lainas: keyboards

Tasos Limperis: percussion

Zacharias Maragkos: electric guitar

Andreas Mouzakis: drums

Stavros Papagiannakopoulos: bouzouki, cümbüş

Giorgos Retikas: acoustic guitar

Teddy Sekeriadis: bass

Leonidas Tzitzos: keyboards, orchestration, programming

Production 
Despina Alchazidou: make up

Vasilis Bouloubasis: grooming

Panagiotis Brakoulias (Track Factory Recording studio): editing, mastering, mix engineer, sound engineer

Alexis Chaimalas: lighting technician

Katy Garbi: executive producer

Konstantinos Georgantas: art direction

Giorgos Gkavalos (View studio): director, video recording

Meletis Kariotis: audio design, lighting design

Dionisis Kolpodinos: styling

Vasilis Koulogeorgiou: audio technician

Antonis Moraitis: audio technician

Orestis Nikolaidis: photographer

Christos Papanikolaou: styling

Dimitris Retouniotis: audio technician

Dionisis Schinas: executive producer

Release history

References

Katy Garbi live albums
2020 live albums
Panik Records albums
Greek-language live albums